The system of German railway wagon classes (Wagengattungen) was introduced in Germany in 1902 and 1905 by the Prussian state railways based on their system of norms, and was soon taken up by the other state railways (Länderbahnen). On the formation of the Deutsche Reichsbahn, the system became mandatory across the whole of Germany. In the course of the years more and more adjustments to it were made. It was finally replaced between 1964 and 1968 when the two German railway administrations - the Deutsche Bundesbahn and the Deutsche Reichsbahn (East Germany) - adopted the internationally standard UIC classifications for passenger coaches and goods wagons. Today, the system is still regularly being used for narrow gauge goods wagons, because these were not generally given UIC designations, as well as on many historical vehicles.

The wagon class comprises one or more main class letters (Hauptgattungszeichen) (in capitals, sometimes with lower case letters in between) and possibly several secondary class letters (Nebengattungszeichen) (always in lower case). Combinations of several main class letters are possible, e.g. on passenger coaches with different accommodation classes.

Main class letters 

In order to distinguish bogie wagons, the last letter of the main class was doubled to begin with, e.g. BC → BCC, G → GG (exceptions were the Post, Salon, Schlaf und Speise where there was no difference). From 1928 the system was changed on passenger coaches. Instead of doubling the letters, the number of axles was indicated where it was greater than two. So an eight-wheeled BC coach was no longer classified as a BCC but as a BC4. That now made it possible to distinguish passenger coaches with three axles or more. For goods wagons, the doubling of letters was retained. Only on Dgw and ZM wagons was the differentiation dropped, whilst the BT, H, Pwg, V and VO wagons had no bogie variants anyway.

Secondary letters for passenger coaches

Secondary letters for goods wagons

Description of the maximum load

Four- and six-wheeled wagons

Wagons with eight wheels or more (including HH wagons)

Description of loading length and loading area

Description of features of importance for train formation

Description of individual wagon classes

Classes G/GG and N

Class H/HH

Classes K/KK, O/OO, VO and X/XX

Classes R/RR and S/SS

Class T/TT

Class V

Class ZM

Class Z/ZZ

Sources 

 Helmut Behrends, Wolfgang Hensel, Gerhard Wiedau: Güterwagen-Archiv 1. transpress, Berlin 1989, .
 Helmut Behrends, Wolfgang Hensel, Gerhard Wiedau: Güterwagen-Archiv 2. transpress, Berlin 1989,  .
 Peter Wagner, Sigrid Wagner, Joachim Deppmeyer: Reisezugwagen 1. Sitz- und Gepäckwagen. transpress 1993, .

See also
 History of rail transport in Germany
 Open wagon
 Pocket wagon

External links 
 Leitzahlen und Nummernsystem für DR-Güterwagen nach 1951 bei Fremo
 Deutsche Güterwagen von 1910 bis 1945

Rolling stock of Germany
Rail freight transport in Germany